Generally speaking, analytic (from , analytikos) refers to the "having the ability to analyze" or "division into elements or principles".

Analytic or analytical can also have the following meanings:

Chemistry
 Analytical chemistry, the analysis of material samples to learn their chemical composition and structure
 Analytical technique, a method that is used to determine the concentration of a chemical compound or chemical element
 Analytical concentration

Mathematics
 Abstract analytic number theory, the application of ideas and techniques from analytic number theory to other mathematical fields
 Analytic combinatorics, a branch of combinatorics that describes combinatorial classes using generating functions
 Analytic element method, a numerical method used to solve partial differential equations
 Analytic expression or analytic solution, a mathematical expression using well-known operations that lend themselves readily to calculation
 Analytic geometry, the study of geometry based on numerical coordinates rather than axioms
 Analytic number theory, a branch of number theory that uses methods from mathematical analysis

Mathematical analysis
 Analytic function, a function that is locally given by a convergent power series
 Analytic capacity, a number that denotes how big a certain bounded analytic function can become
 Analytic continuation, a technique to extend the domain of definition of a given analytic function
 Analytic manifold, a topological manifold with analytic transition maps
 Analytic variety, the set of common solutions of several equations involving analytic functions

Set theory
 Analytical hierarchy, an extension of the arithmetical hierarchy
 Analytic set, the continuous image of a Polish space

Proof theory
 Analytic proof, in structural proof theory, a proof whose structure is simple in a special way
 Analytic tableau, a tree structure used to analyze logical formulas

Computer science
 Analytic or reductive grammar, a kind of formal grammar that works by successively reducing input strings to simpler forms
 Analytics, to find meaningful patterns in data

Other science and technology
 Analytic signal, a particular representation of a signal
 Analytical mechanics, a refined, highly mathematical form of classical mechanics
 Analytical balance, a very high precision (0.1 mg or better) weighing scale

Philosophy

 Analytic philosophy, a style of philosophy that came to dominate English-speaking countries in the 20th century
 Analytic proposition, a statement whose truth can be determined solely through analysis of its meaning
 Analytical Thomism, the movement to present the thought of Thomas Aquinas in the style of modern analytic philosophy
 Postanalytic philosophy, describes a detachment from the mainstream philosophical movement of analytic philosophy, which is the predominant school of thought in English-speaking countries

Social sciences

Psychology 
 Analytical psychology, part of the Jungian psychology movement
 Cognitive analytic therapy, a form of psychological therapy initially developed in the UK by Anthony Ryle
 Psychoanalysis, a set of psychological and psychotherapeutic theories and associated techniques

Sociology 
 Analytic induction, the systematic examination of similarities between various social phenomena to develop concepts or ideas
 Analytic frame, a detailed sketch or outline of some social phenomenon, representing initial idea of a scientist analyzing this phenomenon

Politics 
 Analytical Marxism, an interpretation of Marxism

Linguistics 
 Analytic language, a natural language in which most morphemes are free (separate), instead of fused together

Other areas

 Analytical jurisprudence, the use of analytical reasoning to study legal theory
 Analytic journalism, seeks to make sense of a complex reality in order to create public understanding
 Analytic cubism, one of two major branches of the cubism artistic movement
 Analytical skills

See also
Analytics (disambiguation)
 Analysis (disambiguation)
 Analytical Engine, a 19th-century mechanical general-purpose computer designed by Charles Babbage
 Analytical Society, a 19th-century British group who promoted the use of Leibnizian or analytical calculus, as opposed to Newtonian calculus
 Synthesis (disambiguation)